The AFL Women's season seven Grand Final was an Australian football match held at the Brighton Homes Arena on 27 November 2022 to determine the premiers of the seventh season of the AFL Women's (AFLW) league. The match was contested between the Brisbane Lions and the Melbourne Football Club. Melbourne emerged as winners by four points.

Qualification

Source:

Both the Brisbane Lions and the Melbourne Demons finished at the top of the ladder at the end of the home and away season. In an attempt to secure the top spot in the final round, Melbourne booted 11.13 (79) against a hapless , keeping their opponent to a single point. In the end, the Demons fell short by just 0.3 of a percent - a single point. Brisbane was favoured to win the premiership; three of the previous five AFLW premierships had been won by the minor premiers.

In the Semi-Final, Melbourne faced , the reigning premiers. The Demons had a shaky start, conceding the first three goals of the game, but managed to keep Adelaide scoreless in the second quarter while kicking three goals of their own to lead at half time. The Demons kicked seven goals in the last three quarters to Adelaide's 1.1. In the preliminary final, the Demons overcame a tough , who dominated forward entries but failed to capitalise against Melbourne's defence. Brisbane's path to the Grand Final involved first defeating , a new but much improved side that had inflicted their only defeat of the season, and then defeated Adelaide in the Preliminary Final.

This was the first time these two teams played each other in an AFLW Grand Final, this was Brisbane's fourth grand final and Melbourne's second. It was also the first AFLW grand final to be played in November.

Venue
There was a controversy regarding the venue choice: being the higher ranked team, Brisbane had the choice of location; however, due to The Gabba and Metricon Stadium not being available, the brand new $80 million Brighton Homes Arena was chosen. Some concern was raised that the venue held just 600 grandstand seats, and had a capacity of 8,000 people, which led to many suggesting Marvel Stadium was a better choice of ground.

An initial issue of 6,500 tickets was sold out within minutes, while a second issue of tickets sold out just as quickly.

Broadcast and entertainment
The match was broadcast by the Seven Network and simulcast on Foxtel, Kayo, the afl.com.au and womens.afl websites, and on the AFL and AFLW apps. It was also available on radio nationally via ABC Radio and SEN. Fox Footy coverage was led by commentator Kelli Underwood, with expert commentary from Carlton AFLW coach Daniel Harford, Western Bulldogs premiership captain Ellie Blackburn and Collingwood player Chloe Molloy.

Delta Goodrem performed pre-match entertainment, which was sponsored by Telstra. Goodrem had earlier performed at the 2022 AFL Grand Final with Robbie Williams.

The match was sponsored by the National Australia Bank. Cody Simpson sang the national anthem.

Teams
Final teams were named on Saturday 26 November. Both sides announced unchanged line ups. Despite injury concerns, both Brisbane's Taylor Smith and Melbourne's Tayla Harris were named to play. They had played the previous week despite ankle and shoulder injuries respectively. It was the 50th game, tenth final and fourth grand final for Brisbane's Kate Lutkins, who suffered an ACL injury on 9 January.

Umpires

Field umpires: Thomas Chrystie, Joel Clamp, Nick Jankovskis – Emergency: James Strybos

Boundary umpires: Trent Bowes, Will Morris, Blake Anderson, Dominic Schiliro

Goal umpires: Adam Steger, Tayla Manning – Emergency: Taylor Mattioli

Source:

Match summary 

The match commenced in  heat, which resulted in the AFLW enacting its heat policy, which lengthened the breaks between quarters and allowed for two extra water carriers. An early shot at goal by Melbourne's Daisy Pearce missed, and resulted in a behind.  Within minutes Brisbane's Nat Grider took an intercept mark and hit up a lead from forward Dakota Davidson, who scored the opening goal of the match. On the next centre bounce, the Lions took possession and booted the ball up into their forward fifty-metre arc. In the desperate scramble that followed, Brisbane's Cathy Svarc was subjected to a high tackle, and was awarded a free kick, which she converted to score the second major of the match. Melbourne broke loose in the final minutes of the quarter, but what looked like a certain goal by Melbourne's Megan Fitzsimon, who was headed for an open goal square, or her teammate Alyssa Bannan, was averted at the last moment by a desperate tackle from Grider. The end of the quarter saw the Lions leading the goalless Demons by 11 points.

The second quarter saw Melbourne fight back. Melbourne ruck Lauren Pearce, who ended the day with 17 hitouts, and rover Eliza West, who had 19 disposals, dominated around the clearances, and during the second term the Demons led 16–10 in the inside 50 count. The Demons' Blaithin Mackin scored the team's first major, but scoring opportunities remained elusive. Lions' skipper Breanna Koenen limped off the ground with a knee injury, but the Lions' defence remained in the capable hands of defenders Kate Lutkins and Shannon Campbell, who racked up 19 possessions and eight marks for the day, and the Demons managed only another three behinds for the quarter. Koenen was back on the oval again after the half time break with her knee heavily strapped. At the other end of the ground, Melbourne's Tahlia Gillard managed to keep the Lions' tall forward  Jesse Wardlaw quiet. At half time, the Demons were just two points behind. Rain fell heavily during the break, which had been extended by 20 minutes due to the heat policy.

Melbourne got off to a good start in the third quarter, which was mainly played in Melbourne's forward half. Reward for effort remained elusive: a free kick awarded to Eliza West that looked like another goal opportunity fell short. Then Tayla Harris took a mark in the goal square and converted. It was the fourth time she had played in an AFLW Grand Final, and second time she had scored a goal in one. The goal put her side in front for the first time since the opening minutes of the first quarter. (She also sustained a blow under the eye that left her bleeding and which had to be patched up.) Melbourne nearly scored another goal from a dribble kick from Casey Sherriff, but it hit the post. The umpires injected a note of farce into the game with different calls being made by two umpires, resulting in Alyssa Bannan tackling Dakota Davidson when she was about to take a free kick. Normally this would have resulted in a 50-metre penalty, but the umpires acknowledged that the mistake was theirs, and none was awarded; Davidson was simply instructed to take her kick. The Lions had a chance to regain the lead late in the quarter, but a kick from Davidson missed to the right.

The final quarter was a desperate affair with neither side able to score a goal, which would have given them the win. Melbourne had the most opportunities, but managed only a rushed behind. The final siren therefore saw the underdog Demons emerge as the winners. AFL Commissioner Gabrielle Trainor presented the umpires' medals and AFLW premiership player Abbey Holmes presented the premiership cup to Melbourne captain Daisy Pearce and coach Mick Stinear. As is customary, premiership medals were presented to members of the winning team by child players from the Auskick program. Pearce placed her medal on the young girl presenting the medal. Pearce had won ten premierships with the Darebin Falcons, but this was her first AFLW premiership.

Scoreboard

Best on Ground medal 

Brisbane Lions defender Shannon Campbell was awarded the medal for the best player on the ground. Campbell was the first player from a losing AFL Women's Grand Final team to win the award, which was presented by AFL Commissioner Simone Wilkie.

See also

 AFL Women's Grand Final
 2022 AFL Grand Final

References

External links
 Match Program

Grand Final
AFL Women's season seven Grand Final
AFL Women's Grand Finals
Sport in Ipswich, Queensland
Australian rules football in Queensland